was a town located in Mitoyo District, Kagawa Prefecture, Japan.

As of 2003, the town had an estimated population of 7,584 and a density of 227.68 persons per km² (592.3 persons per mi²). The total area was 33.31 km² (12.8 mi²).

On January 1, 2006, Mito, along with the towns of Mino, Nio, Saita, Takase, Takuma and Toyonaka (all from Mitoyo District), was merged to create the city of Mitoyo and no longer exists as an independent municipality.

Geography 
Western part of Kagawa
Rivers: Saita River, Kaunda River, Kouchi River

History 
A long time ago - Yamamoto was part of Toyota District.
April 1, 1955　- Mitoyo District's Tsuji Village, Kouchi Village, Kōda Village, and Saita-Ono Village were merged to create Yamamoto Village.
November 3, 1957　- Renamed Yamamoto Town.
January 1, 2006 - Yamamoto was merged with 6 other towns to create Mitoyo city.

Administration

Mayor
1955　Founder Hara (数栄)
1959　2nd Maya (真屋 友一)
1971　3rd Ando (安藤 要)
1979　4th  Hara (原 正司)
1991　5th Iwakura (岩倉 礼一)
1999　6th Ohashi (大橋 良男)

Education 
The following were elementary and junior high schools in the town.  There were no high schools or secondary schools in Mino.

Tsuji Elementary School
Kouchi Elementary School
Ono Elementary School
Kaunda Elementary School
Mitoyo Junior High School

Transportation 

Bus
Takase Jishou Unkou(Independent Carrier)
Highways
Expressway
There was no Takamatsu Expressway connection in Yamamoto, but there was one in Toyonaka, north of Yamamoto.
National Highways
Route 377
Regional Highways
Route 5 - Kan'onji(Kagawa and Tokushima)
Route 6 - Kan'onji(Kagawa and Tokushima)
 Shikoku Railway Company(JR Shikoku)
 There is no railroad in Yamamoto, but there is one in Toyonaka to the north and Saita to the south

Famous Places and Events

Shikoku 88 Temple Pilgrimage
 Number 67 Daikoji Temple

Famous People From Yamamoto
Mise Kouji（Fukuoka SoftBank Hawks）

External links
 Official website of Mitoyo 

Dissolved municipalities of Kagawa Prefecture
Mitoyo, Kagawa